The 2007–08 season was Leeds United F.C.'s first ever season in the third tier of English football after relegation from the Championship the previous season. They finished in the play-offs in League One.

Season summary
For much of the summer of 2007, there were many doubts about whether or not Leeds would even survive until their first-ever season in the third tier, with the club massively in debt by League One standards, and having few assets to their name thanks to having sold off Elland Road and their training ground during their previous spell in administration in 2003-2004. The club's failure to agree a company voluntary arrangement with their creditors (most notably the HMRC) saw them suffer the indignity of becoming the first Football League club since Barnet in 1993 to be put up for an expulsion vote. The other clubs ultimately voted for Leeds to retain their League status, but also to be subjected to a 15-point deduction.

Despite this, and many predictions that they would suffer what would have been a third relegation in four years, the team won their first seven games and effectively eliminated the 15-point deduction. Results began to slip after assistant manager Gus Poyet left to join Tottenham Hotspur as assistant manager in November, and then their form further declined after manager Dennis Wise himself departed to become director of football at Newcastle United. Former club hero Gary McAllister returned as manager, but struggled to turn their form around, leaving them looking hopelessly off the play-off race by mid-March. However, a late flurry of wins saw Leeds finish 5th in the league, qualifying them for the play-offs. In the play-off semi-finals, the club beat Carlisle over two legs, booking them a place at Wembley in the final. However, dreams were shattered when the team were beaten 1–0 by Doncaster, resigning the club to a second season in League One.

Jermaine Beckford had an impressive first full season with the club, being named League One Player of the Year and scoring over 20 goals in the process. The club recorded the highest attendance in the country outside the Premier League, in the 2–1 victory against Gillingham in May.

First-team squad

Squad information

Appearances (starts and substitute appearances) and goals include those in The Premiership, The Championship (and playoffs), League One (and playoffs), FA Cup, League Cup, Football League Trophy, UEFA Champions League and UEFA Cup.
Squad includes players registered with the club on the last day of the season (25 May 2008) only.

Squad stats

Disciplinary record

Awards

Player of the Year Awards

The results of the 2007–08 Leeds United F.C. Player of the Year Awards were announced at a dinner on 29 April 2008 at Elland Road.

 Fans' Player of the Year: Jermaine Beckford (Runners-up: David Prutton, Jonathan Douglas)
 Fans' Young Player of the Year: Jonny Howson (Runner-up: Paul Huntington)
 Fans' Goal of the Season: Jermaine Beckford vs Hartlepool (8 September 2007)
 Players' Player of the Year: Jermaine Beckford
 Players' Young Player of the Year: Jonny Howson
 Best Contribution to Community: Casper Ankergren

Team of the Week
The following players have been selected in the official Coca-Cola Football League One team of the week.

 20 August 2007: Alan Thompson
 27 August 2007: Jermaine Beckford, Trésor Kandol
 3 September 2007: Jonathan Douglas, Trésor Kandol
 10 September 2007: Jermaine Beckford
 17 September 2007: Jermaine Beckford
 24 September 2007: Jonathan Douglas, Frazer Richardson
 1 October 2007: Sébastien Carole
 8 October 2007: Manuel Rui Marques, Jamie Clapham
 15 October 2007: Sébastien Carole
 22 October 2007: Matt Heath, Jonathan Douglas
 29 October 2007: Jonathan Douglas
 19 November 2007: Jonathan Howson, Jermaine Beckford
 10 December 2007: Jermaine Beckford, Jonathan Douglas
 17 December 2007: Jonathan Douglas
 28 January 2008: Paul Huntington, Peter Sweeney
 3 March 2008: Jonny Howson, Trésor Kandol
 10 March 2008: Casper Ankergren, Bradley Johnson
 17 March 2008: Manuel Rui Marques, Dougie Freedman
 7 April 2008: Bradley Johnson
 14 April 2008: Jonny Howson, Dougie Freedman
 21 April 2008: Alan Sheehan

Other Awards
The following Leeds United F.C. players and staff have won the following awards whilst contracted to the club in the 2007–08 season.

Coca-Cola League One Manager of the Month: Dennis Wise (August, September)
 Coca-Cola League One Fans' Player of the Month: Trésor Kandol (September), Jermaine Beckford (October, January)
 Coca-Cola League One Player of the Month: Casper Ankergren (September), Dougie Freedman (April)
 FourFourTwo Player of the Year for Coca-Cola League 1: Jermaine Beckford (2008)
 PFA League One Team of the Season: Jermaine Beckford
Yorkshire Evening Post Player of the Year (Leeds United): David Prutton, (Runner-up: Jermaine Beckford)

Transfers

In

Out

1Original transfer fee was £300k, but rose to £500k when Stoke City were promoted to The Premiership.
2Player came out of retirement in November 2008 to play for MK Dons.
Detailing transfers up to 25 May 2008 only.

Loans

Details loan moves up to 25 May 2008 only.

Pre-season

Competitions

Overall summary

1 Qualified for play-offs. Lost to Doncaster Rovers in the final. With the 15-point deduction, would have finished second and received automatic promotion.

League One

Table

Results summary

Results by round

Matches

Play-offs

Last updated: 25 May 2008.
Source: The Football League

FA Cup

League Cup

Football League Trophy

Notes

References

External links
 
 Official Website
 Sky Sports

Leeds United F.C. seasons
Leeds United
Foot